The canton of Guînes is a former canton situated in the department of the Pas-de-Calais and in the Nord-Pas-de-Calais region of northern France. It was disbanded following the French canton reorganisation which came into effect in March 2015. It had a total of 16,775 inhabitants (2012).

Geography 
The canton is organised around Guînes in the arrondissement of Calais. The altitude varies from 0m (Guînes) to 199m (Herbinghen) for an average altitude of 59m.

The canton comprised 16 communes:

Alembon
Andres
Bouquehault
Boursin
Caffiers
Campagne-lès-Guines
Fiennes
Guînes
Hames-Boucres
Hardinghen
Herbinghen
Hermelinghen
Hocquinghen
Licques
Pihen-lès-Guînes
Sanghen

Population

See also 
Cantons of Pas-de-Calais 
Communes of Pas-de-Calais 
Arrondissements of the Pas-de-Calais department

References

Guines
2015 disestablishments in France
States and territories disestablished in 2015